The Red Crow is the second studio album by Altan, released in November 1990 on the Green Linnet Records label. The title track, written by Mairéad Ní Mhaonaigh also features on her 2008 début album, Imeall.

Critical reception
The Red Crow is the first of three Altan records to win the prestigious "Celtic/British Isles Album of the Year Award" from the National Association of Independent Record Distributors and Manufacturers (NAIRD).

Track listing
All titles are arranged by Altan.

 "Yellow Tinker/Lady Montgomery/The Merry Harriers" – 2:55
 "Con Cassidy's/Dusty Millar" – 3:01
 "The Flower of Magherally" – 4:19
 "Brenda Stubbert's/Breen's/The Red Box" – 4:51
 "Inis Dhún Rámha" – 3:46
 "Jimmy Lyon's/The Teelin/The Red Crow/The Broken Bridge" – 4:42
 "Moll Dubh A'ghleanna" – 3:31
 "The Wedding Jig/Hiudaí Gallagher's March/James Byrne's/Mickey Doherty's/Welcome Home Grainne" – 6:45
 "Mallaí Chroch Shlí" – 3:54
 "Tommy Bhetty's Waltz" – 5:07
 "The Emyvale/Ríl Gan Ainm/The Three Merry Sisters of Fate" – 3:05

All titles are traditional, except the following:
"The Red Crow" – composed by Mairéad Ní Mhaonaigh
"Brenda Stubbert's" – composed by Jerry Holland
"The Red Box" – composed by Arty McGlynn

See tune identifications for this album at irishtune.info.

Personnel

Altan
Mairéad Ní Mhaonaigh – Fiddle, Vocals
Frankie Kennedy – Flute, Vocals (backing), Whistling
Paul O'Shaughnessy – Fiddle
Ciarán Curran – Bouzouki,  Guitar
Mark Kelly – Guitar, Vocals (backing)

Guest musicians
Johnny 'Ringo' McDonagh
Marie Askin
Dermot Byrne
Séamus Quinn
 Garvan Gallagher
Dónal Lunny
Máire Bhreathnach
Niall Toner
P.J. Curtis

Production
P.J. Curtis – Producer
Dan Fitzgerald – Engineer 
Pete McGrath – Assistant Engineer 
Mary McShane – Assistant Engineer 
Greenberg Kingsley – Design
Ross Wilson – Artwork

References

External links
 Artist's page for this recording
 Mairéad Ní Mhaonaigh's page for this recording

Altan (band) albums
1990 albums